Snapshots is a Canadian reality television series for children, which premiered on CBC Television in September 2016 and ran for 6 episodes. Hosted by Dalmar Abuzeid, the series features kids learning photography skills through a competition to produce the best photograph in different areas of photography. The series also features an online component, in which home viewers can submit their own photographs, based on challenges depicted within the show, for judging as a separate contest. It continued to run on CBC on Saturdays during its CBC Kids block. It is unknown if Snapshots will be renewed for a second season.

Episodes
 Making A Splash
 We Can Be Comic Book Heroes
 Flashing Lights
 Catch Me In Action
 The World Up Close
 Shoot & Score

References

Canadian children's reality television series
CBC Kids original programming
2016 Canadian television series debuts
2016 Canadian television series endings
2010s Canadian reality television series
2010s Canadian children's television series
Television series about children